The Arrows A22 was the car with which the Arrows team competed in the  Formula One season.  It was driven by Jos Verstappen, who was in his second year with the team, and Enrique Bernoldi, a rookie who brought sponsorship from Red Bull, at the expense of Pedro de la Rosa who was unexpectedly dropped shortly before the season started.

Overview

The A22 was a development of the previous year's highly promising A21. The front suspension was changed from a pullrod to a pushrod arrangement, but otherwise the two cars were almost identical. However, the project was hamstrung by changing engine suppliers for the second year in a row. In early 2000, Renault announced their return to F1 for 2001, and bought Supertec. Walkinshaw had been offered an exclusive and most importantly cheap deal and technical director Mike Coughlan believed the new engine suited the Arrows chassis package better. Initial testing took place in August 2000. Jos Verstappen was also enthused about the new engine at first. The engine was less powerful than its predecessor, and also had reliability problems. The car barely completed a lap during its initial shakedown.

The team made the decision to equip the car with a very small fuel tank.  This resulted in several high-profile, low-fuel strategies as the drivers, particularly Verstappen, used their light cars to good effect in the opening stages of many of the Grands Prix.  Despite generally being outqualified by Bernoldi, the Dutchman's race pace was much quicker by comparison.  However, the team's strategy only secured one point, at the Austrian GP. A memorable drive in a wet Malaysia where Verstappen ran as high as second at one point was unrewarded as he was forced to stop for fuel and therefore drop out of the points in the closing stages of the race. There were other moments of promise, but Verstappen also blotted his copybook by getting involved in an incident with race leading WilliamsF1 driver Juan Pablo Montoya at Interlagos, taking the Colombian out and costing him a $15,000 fine. Verstappen was also publicly critical of his team mate, labelling Bernoldi "the worst team mate I've ever had." This was in direct contrast to Bernoldi's predecessor Pedro De la Rosa.

In an attempt to improve front end downforce, an elevated front wing was tried in practice at Monaco, which was immediately banned by the FIA on safety grounds. The race is remembered for Bernoldi holding up David Coulthard's McLaren for nearly 40 laps, which caused the Scotsman to publicly criticise Bernoldi and the Arrows team.

By the end of the season, Arrows' lack of testing and limited budget began to tell, with both drivers sinking further towards the back of the field. While Orange remained as title sponsors, Eurobet terminated their sponsorship after posting huge losses. Bernoldi's Red Bull sponsorship went some way to offset this, but European Aviation and the associated logistical support they provided was moved to Minardi after Paul Stoddart bought that team just prior to the season.

The team eventually finished tenth in the Constructors' Championship, with one point.

Sponsors:
Asiatech,
Bridgestone,
Orange,
Red Bull,
chello

Complete Formula One results
(key) (results in bold indicate pole position)

References

External links

Arrows Formula One cars
2001 Formula One season cars